Trou-du-Nord is a commune in the Trou-du-Nord Arrondissement, in the Nord-Est department of Haiti. 
It has a population of 37,405.

Communal Sections 
The commune consists of three communal sections, namely:
 Garcin, rural
 Roucou, urban and rural, containing the city of Trou-du-Nord
 Roche Plate, rural

References

Populated places in Nord-Est (department)
Communes of Haiti